Psammopolia sala is a moth of the family Noctuidae. It is restricted to the type locality, the San Simeon Dunes, Oceana, San Luis Obispo County, California.

It flies over outer coastal dunes. It has been found.

Adults are on wing in May and again in September and October.

External links
A Revision of Lasionycta Aurivillius (Lepidoptera, Noctuidae) for North America and notes on Eurasian species, with descriptions of 17 new species, 6 new subspecies, a new genus, and two new species of Tricholita Grote

Hadeninae